Joshua Edward Russell (August 9, 1867 – June 21, 1953) was an American politician who served one term as a U.S. Representative from Ohio from 1915 to 1917.

Early life and career 
Born near Sidney, Ohio, Russell attended the common schools and Sidney High School.
He studied law with George A. Marshall.
He was admitted to the bar in 1893 and commenced practice in Sidney.
He served as member of the city board of education in 1894 and 1895.
City solicitor 1895-1899.
He served as member of the State senate 1905-1908.

Congress 
Russell was elected as a Republican to the Sixty-fourth Congress (March 4, 1915 – March 3, 1917).
He was an unsuccessful candidate for reelection in 1916 to the Sixty-fifth Congress.

Later career and death 
He resumed the practice of law.
He died in Sidney, Ohio, June 21, 1953.
He was interred in Graceland Cemetery.

In 1894 Russell married Jennie C. Laughlin. They had one child. He was a member of the Masons, Knights of Pythias, Benevolent and Protective Order of Elks and Improved Order of Red Men.

References

Sources

1867 births
1953 deaths
People from Sidney, Ohio
Ohio lawyers
Ohio state senators
Republican Party members of the United States House of Representatives from Ohio